The 1950 Nebraska gubernatorial election was held on November 7, 1950, and featured incumbent Governor Val Peterson, a Republican, defeating Democratic nominee, former state Senator Walter R. Raecke, to win a third and final two-year term in office.

Democratic primary

Candidates
Terry Carpenter, former U.S. Representative
Henry L. Fillman, farmer and insurance businessman
Frank B. Morrison, attorney and former school superintendent
Walter R. Raecke, former Speaker of the Nebraska Legislature
Harry R. Swanson, former Secretary of State

Results

Republican primary

Candidates
Ernest A. Adams, Douglas County Treasurer
Val Peterson, incumbent Governor
A. B. Walker

Results

General election

Results

References

Gubernatorial
1950
Nebraska
November 1950 events in the United States